Sugarfoot is a 1951 American Western film directed by Edwin L. Marin and starring Randolph Scott.

Aside from the title, the film has nothing to do with the 1957 television series of the same name, which was inspired by another feature Western, Michael Curtiz's The Boy from Oklahoma (1954) starring Will Rogers Jr.

Plot
Jackson Redan, a Confederate States Army veteran of the American Civil War, attempts to rebuild his life by moving to Arizona Territory. His politeness and courtly Southern gentleman demeanor cause the residents of Prescott to name him Sugarfoot. Among his new acquaintances are merchant Don Miguel Wormser and saloon singer Reva Cairn. An enemy from Redan's past, Jacob Stint, has also taken up residence in Prescott and pays unwanted attention to Reva. Redan rescues her, but afterwards treats her coldly. Wormser entrusts Redan with four thousand dollars, which Stint steals, but Wormser forgives Redan. On business for Wormser, Redan makes a favorable deal, which earns him the enmity of Wormser's rival, Asa Goodhue. Redan reclaims the stolen four thousand dollars from Stint, but is shot in the process. Reva nurses him during his recovery, which thaws his attitude towards her. Stint and Goodhue continue to cheat the townspeople, so Redan puts aside his courtliness to end their villainy.

Cast
 Randolph Scott as Jackson 'Sugarfoot' Redan
 Adele Jergens as Reva Cairn
 Raymond Massey as Jacob Stint
 S. Z. Sakall as Don Miguel Wormser
 Robert Warwick as J.C. Crane
 Arthur Hunnicutt as Fly-Up-the-Creek Jones
 Hugh Sanders as Asa Goodhue

See also
 List of American films of 1951

References

External links

1951 films
Warner Bros. films
1951 Western (genre) films
Films directed by Edwin L. Marin
Films scored by Max Steiner
American Western (genre) films
1950s English-language films
1950s American films